Owusu-Ansah Kontoh (born 24 August 1993 in Kumasi) is a Ghanaian footballer who plays as a defender.

Career

Asante Kotoko
He made his first steps as part of Ghana Premier League club Asante Kotoko Coached by Serbian manager Bogdan Korak, during the summer of 2011, the team came on a tour to Serbia to play a series of friendlies and to try to impress clubs and scouts in Europe.

Metalac Gornji Milanovac 
Kwame Boateng and Owusu-Ansah Kontoh finally stayed in Serbia and joined Metalac Gornji Milanovac a club playing in the Serbian SuperLiga. He made his debut in official matches on September 20, 2011, in a 2011–12 Serbian Cup match against FK Srem, making his league debut 4 days later in a round 6 match against FK BSK Borča.

Novi Pazar 
After his contract with Metalac Gornji Milanovac expired on 30 June 2015, Ansah remained a free agent until January 2016 when he joined Serbian SuperLiga team Novi Pazar. However, he only remained with Novi Pazar for six months.

AEL 
In July 2016, Owusu was tested by the Greek Superleague team AEL. He made a good appearance in his debut on the friendly match against Levadiakos and resulted being offered a contract which he accepted. During the game, he surprised AEL fans with his powerful throw in and his excellent ball handling.

Orange County 
During the winter-break of 2017–18 he moved to the United States and joined USL Championship side Orange County SC.

Phoenix Rising 
Kontoh signed with Phoenix Rising FC on December 5, 2019.

References

External links
 

1993 births
Living people
Footballers from Kumasi
Ghanaian footballers
Ghanaian expatriate footballers
Association football defenders
Asante Kotoko S.C. players
FK Metalac Gornji Milanovac players
FK Novi Pazar players
Serbian First League players
Serbian SuperLiga players
Expatriate footballers in Serbia
Orange County SC players
Phoenix Rising FC players
USL Championship players